This is a list of prime ministers of Belgium by time in office.

Rank by time in office
Affiliation

See also

 Prime Minister of Belgium
 List of Belgian prime ministers by political affiliation
 Politics of Belgium

References

List of Prime Ministers by time in office
List of Prime Ministers by time in office
Prime Ministers by time in office
Belgian Prime Ministers by time in office
Time